The Southern Illinois Salukis baseball team represents Southern Illinois University in NCAA Division I college baseball. They are part of the Missouri Valley Conference. Twenty-four Saluki Baseball alumni have gone on to the Major Leagues.

History
On June 20, 2019, Southern Illinois University Director of Athletics Jerry Kill announced Lance Rhodes as the program's new head coach. Rhodes is a Sikeston, Missouri, native, and joined the Saluki baseball program from the University of Missouri, where he had served as the head assistant and recruiting coordinator. Prior to his time at the University of Missouri, Rhodes served as the recruiting coordinator at Southeast Missouri State University; helping them to three years of program dominance by winning three straight Ohio Valley Conference championships (2014, 2015, 2016).

SIU baseball started as a club sport in 1921, lasting until 1924. From 1925 until 1946, the school did not have a baseball program.

In 1947, Abe Martin revived the program as an intercollegiate sport and it has remained ever since, being an elite program in the late 1960s through the 1980s.

SIU plays its home games at Itchy Jones Stadium.

SIU in the NCAA tournament
SIU has a proud history in the NCAA Baseball Tournament, held in Omaha since 1950 and at Johnny Rosenblatt Stadium from 1950 through 2010. They have made the College World Series 5 times and finished as the national champion runner-up twice (losing out to the University of Southern California Trojans both times) and as third-place finishers twice.

Head coaches

Notable former players
Sam Coonrod, current Major League Baseball pitcher for the Philadelphia Phillies
Jim Dwyer, Retired Major League Baseball outfielder
Steve Finley, Retired Major League Baseball center fielder, 5-time Gold Glove winner, 2-time All-Star
Jason Frasor, Major League Baseball pitcher for the Toronto Blue Jays, Chicago White Sox, Texas Rangers and Kansas City Royals
Joe Hall, Retired Major League Baseball pitcher
Jerry Hairston Jr., Major League Baseball second baseman for the San Diego Padres
Duane Kuiper, Retired Major League Baseball second baseman, announcer, commentator for EA Sports baseball video games
Al Levine, Former Major League Baseball pitcher currently pitching for the Newark Bears of the independent Atlantic League.
Dan Radison, current Major League Baseball 1st base coach for the Washington Nationals
Dave Stieb, Retired Major League Baseball pitcher, 7 Time All-Star, Pitched No-Hitter on September 2, 1990.
Bill Stein, Retired Major League Baseball infielder

See also
List of NCAA Division I baseball programs

References